The 2019 Volvo Car Open was a women's tennis event on the 2019 WTA Tour. It took place between April 1 – 7, 2019 and was the 47th edition of the Charleston Open tournament and a Premier level tournament. The event took place at the Family Circle Tennis Center, on Daniel Island, Charleston, United States. It was the only event of the clay court season played on green clay.

Points and prize money

Point distribution

Prize money

Singles main draw entrants

Seeds 

1 Rankings as of March 18, 2019.

Other entrants 
The following players received wildcards into the main draw:
  Sabine Lisicki
  Emma Navarro
  Shelby Rogers

The following player received entry using a protected ranking into the main draw: 
  Anna-Lena Friedsam

The following players received entry from the qualifying draw:
  Destanee Aiava
  Lauren Davis
  Francesca Di Lorenzo
  Magdalena Fręch
  Nadiia Kichenok
  Kateryna Kozlova
  Astra Sharma 
  Martina Trevisan

The following player received entry as a Lucky Loser:
  Conny Perrin

Withdrawals 
Before the tournament
  Bianca Andreescu → replaced by  Irina Khromacheva 
 Ashleigh Barty → replaced by  Varvara Lepchenko
  Irina-Camelia Begu → replaced by  Jessica Pegula
  Alizé Cornet → replaced by  Conny Perrin
  Daria Gavrilova → replaced by  Veronika Kudermetova
  Camila Giorgi → replaced by  Taylor Townsend
  Hsieh Su-wei → replaced by  Fanny Stollár
  Ons Jabeur → replaced by  Madison Brengle
  Aleksandra Krunić → replaced by  Laura Siegemund
  Bernarda Pera → replaced by  Natalia Vikhlyantseva
  Anastasia Potapova → replaced by  Kristýna Plíšková
  Yulia Putintseva → replaced by  Sara Errani
  Lesia Tsurenko → replaced by  Ysaline Bonaventure
  Zheng Saisai → replaced by  Mandy Minella

Doubles main draw entrants

Seeds 

1 Rankings as of March 18, 2019.

Other entrants 
The following pairs received wildcards into the doubles main draw:
  Chloe Beck /  Emma Navarro  
  Sara Errani /  Martina Trevisan

Champions

Singles 

  Madison Keys def.  Caroline Wozniacki, 7–6(7–5), 6–3

Doubles 

  Anna-Lena Grönefeld /  Alicja Rosolska def.  Irina Khromacheva /  Veronika Kudermetova, 7–6(9–7), 6–2

References

External links 
 

2019 WTA Tour
2019 in American tennis
2019 in sports in South Carolina
2019 Volvo Car Open
April 2019 sports events in the United States